Shkarbynka is a rural-type settlement in Podilsk Raion, Odesa Oblast, Ukraine. Incorporated in 1901, it has a population of 61, and an area of 0.389 km2.

History 
During the Holodomor famine of 1933, kulak Vasiliy Horbatiuk was the leader of the Shkarbynka kolkhoz.  In order to prevent his village from starving, Horbatiuk allowed the people to glean the fields.  He was promptly arrested for this act, and he died at the age of 28 in prison.

Until 18 July 2020, Shkarbynka belonged to Liubashivka Raion. The raion was abolished in July 2020 as part of the administrative reform of Ukraine, which reduced the number of raions of Odesa Oblast to seven. The area of Liubashivka Raion was merged into Podilsk Raion.

References

Villages in Podilsk Raion